The 1968 Baltimore Orioles season was a season in American baseball. The team finished second in the American League with a record of 91 wins and 71 losses, 12 games behind the AL and World Series champion Detroit Tigers. The team was managed for the first 80 games by Hank Bauer (who won 43 of them) and he was replaced right after the All-Star break by Earl Weaver. The Orioles' home games were played at Memorial Stadium.

Following the season, it was announced that the American League, along with the National League, would be split into two divisions for the 1969 season in order to accommodate the admittance of two new franchises to each league. The Orioles were assigned to the new American League East division.

Offseason 
 November 28, 1967: Elrod Hendricks was drafted by the Orioles from the California Angels in the 1967 rule 5 draft.
 November 28, 1967: Eddie Fisher was traded by the Baltimore Orioles with Bob Scott (minors) and John Scruggs (minors) to the Cleveland Indians for Gordy Lund and John O'Donoghue.
 November 29, 1967: Luis Aparicio, Russ Snyder and John Matias were traded by the Orioles to the Chicago White Sox for Don Buford, Roger Nelson and Bruce Howard.
 January 27, 1968: Tom Walker was drafted by the Orioles in the 1st round (9th pick) of the 1968 Major League Baseball Draft.

Regular season 
On April 27, 1968, Tom Phoebus would throw a no-hitter versus the Boston Red Sox. Frank Robinson would contribute with three RBIs in the win.

Season standings

Record vs. opponents

Notable transactions 
 June 15, 1968: Bruce Howard was traded by the Orioles to the Washington Senators for Fred Valentine.

Roster

Player stats

Batting

Starters by position 
Note: Pos = Position; G = Games played; AB = At bats; H = Hits; Avg. = Batting average; HR = Home runs; RBI = Runs batted in

Other batters 
Note: G = Games played; AB = At bats; H = Hits; Avg. = Batting average; HR = Home runs; RBI = Runs batted in

Pitching

Starting pitchers 
Note: G = Games pitched; IP = Innings pitched; W = Wins; L = Losses; ERA = Earned run average; SO = Strikeouts

Other pitchers 
Note: G = Games pitched; IP = Innings pitched; W = Wins; L = Losses; ERA = Earned run average; SO = Strikeouts

Relief pitchers 
Note: G = Games pitched; W = Wins; L = Losses; SV = Saves; ERA = Earned run average; SO = Strikeouts

Farm system

Notes

References 

1968 Baltimore Orioles team page at Baseball Reference
1968 Baltimore Orioles season at baseball-almanac.com

Baltimore Orioles seasons
Baltimore Orioles season
Baltimore Orioles